Liberty Amor Poole (born 2 September 1999) is an English television personality and model. In 2021, she appeared on the seventh series of Love Island and in 2022, on the fourteenth series of Dancing on Ice.

Life and career
Poole was born on 2 September 1999 in Birmingham, England. Poole had considered becoming a doctor and  started her education to do so, but quickly realised it was not for her. She then switched to studying marketing at Birmingham City University, which she preferred. Alongside her studies, Poole worked at Nando's.

In June 2021, Poole became a contestant on the seventh series of Love Island. She coupled up with Jake Cornish on the first day; they split up four days before the final and decided to walk from the series on 20 August 2021, before announcing their split to the rest of the cast. and the pair remained civil. Since leaving Love Island, Poole has shown no interest in watching it back but admits to having enjoyed her experience. Poole and some of her Love Island co-stars presented the award for Newcomer at the 26th National Television Awards. Later that month, she was announced at the new brand ambassador for fashion label InTheStyle in a deal worth £1 million. In October 2021, Poole has also had brand deals with  Skinny Tan and Boux Avenue. In January 2022, Poole began competing on the fourteenth series of Dancing on Ice. She was announced to be competing in October 2021. She was the 4th contestant eliminated, placing 9th.

Filmography

See also
 List of Dancing on Ice contestants
 List of Love Island (2015 TV series) contestants

References

1999 births
English female models
Living people
People from Birmingham, West Midlands
Television personalities from Essex
Love Island (2015 TV series) contestants